Stella Pope Duarte (born South Phoenix) is a Latina American novelist.

Life
She graduated from Arizona State University with a B.A. and MA in Educational Counseling.
She taught at Arizona State University from 1999–2008, and South Mountain Community College.
She was a member of the Arizona Commission on the Arts from 2006 to 2010.

Awards
 2009 American Book Award, for If I Die in Juarez
 2004 Barbara Deming Memorial Fund Award
 2001 Arizona Commission on the Arts Creative Writing Fellowship, for Let Their Spirits Dance
 1997 Arizona Commission on the Arts Creative Writing Fellowship, for Fragile Night

Works

Anthology

References

External links

 "Author's website"
 "Stella Pope Duarte", Superstition Review, Spring 2009
 "Spotlight on Stella Pope Duarte", La Bloga, March 10 2008
 "Stella Pope Duarte, A Writer's Call: Nowhere to Run", Barriozona Magazine, March 6 2006

20th-century American novelists
Arizona State University alumni
Arizona State University faculty
Writers from Phoenix, Arizona
Living people
Hispanic and Latino American novelists
21st-century American novelists
American women novelists
20th-century American women writers
21st-century American women writers
American Book Award winners
Novelists from Arizona
Year of birth missing (living people)
American women academics